George Ackerley (1887–1958) was an English footballer who played in the Football League for Liverpool and Leeds City.

References

English footballers
Liverpool F.C. players
Leeds City F.C. players
English Football League players
1887 births
1958 deaths
Association football inside forwards